Mecyclothorax bilaianus is a species of ground beetle in the subfamily Psydrinae. It was described by Baehr in 1998.

References

bilaianus
Beetles described in 1998